Nicolás Arroyo Márquez (31 August 1917 in Havana, Cuba - 13 July 2008 in Washington, D.C.) was a Cuban architect, diplomat and minister. He was the last Cuban Ambassador to the United States in 1958 before Fidel Castro's rise to power. He had previously served in the government of Fulgencio Batista as the Minister of Public Works (1952–1958).

Arroyo was the third of five children born to lawyer Nicholas Arroyo, and Hortensia Marquez. He received his architecture degree from the University of Havana in 1941 and practiced in Cuba until 1959, during which time he also served as Cuba's minister of public works. In December 1942, he married fellow architect Gabriela Menendez Garcia-Beltran (died 10 July 2008) and formed the architectural firm "Arroyo y Menendez."  Arroyo was the Cuban ambassador to the United States from 1957 to 1958.  After the 1959 Cuban revolution, he settled in Washington, D.C., and established an architectural practice focused on residential and commercial projects; he also had business interests in South America and Arlington, Virginia.  Arroyo was a member of the American Institute of Architects and served on the U.S. Commission of Fine Arts from 1971 to 1976.

References

 El Nuevo Herald; Vintage Havana Modern Architecture Leader Dies by Wilfredo Cancio Isla; 27 July 2008.
 Guillermo Jimenez; Los Propietarios de Cuba 1958; Editorial de Ciencias Sociales, Havana, Cuba, 2007; 

1917 births
2008 deaths
Cuban diplomats
Ambassadors of Cuba to the United States
Government ministers of Cuba
Cuban architects